Austrocochlea quadrasi a species of small sea snail, a marine gastropod mollusk in the family Trochidae, the top snails.

Description
The size of the adult shell varies between 7 mm and 12 mm. The imperforate shell has a conical shape and consists of  five whorls. The sutures are impressed in an irregularly way. It is in appearance somewhat similar to Austrocochlea porcata. The minute tubercles at the base of the callous, slightly oblique  columella are rather more conspicuous than in that species. The numerous revolving lirae and the three keels are granulose. The convex base of the shell is strongly ridged and brightly spotted. The aperture is subquadrate. It is silvery white on the inside, and has 7 lirae. The peristome is sharp and maculated.

Distribution
This marine shell occurs off the Philippines.

References

quadrasi
Gastropods described in 1898